Huguo Temple is a Buddhist temple located in Jingshan Park, Wenzhou, Zhejiang.

History
The temple was first built in 785, under the Tang dynasty (618–907), and went through many changes and repairs through the following dynasties. Most of the present structures in the temple were rebuilt or renovated between 2003 and 2009.

Architecture
The complex modeled the architectural style of the Tang dynasty (618–907). The complex include the following halls: Shanmen, Mahavira Hall, Hall of Four Heavenly Kings, Hall of Guanyin, Bell tower, Drum tower, Hall of Jade Buddha, Hall of Guru, Dharma Hall,  Dharma Hall, Meditation Hall, Reception Hall, Dining Room, etc.

Gallery

References

Buddhist temples in Wenzhou
Buildings and structures in Wenzhou
Tourist attractions in Wenzhou
2009 establishments in China
21st-century Buddhist temples
Religious buildings and structures completed in 2009